Eurymelinae is a subfamily of leafhoppers in the family Cicadellidae.

Selected genera 

 Barolineocerus Freytag, 2008
 Eurymela Lepeletier & Serville, 1825
 Eurymelessa Evans, 1933
 Eurymelita Evans, 1933
 Eurymeloides Ashmead, 1889
 Idiocerus Lewis, 1834
 Oncopsis Burmeister, 1838
 Pediopsoides Matsumura, 1912

References

External links 

 
Cicadellidae